Madonna of the Rose may refer to:
Madonna of the Rose (Orsanmichele)
Madonna of the Rose (Parmigianino)
Madonna of the Rose (Raphael)

See also
Madonna of the Roses
Madonna of the Rose Bower